Manang Tayo is a sub-district and small town in Mueang Narathiwat District of Narathiwat Province, Thailand. It lies between Rangae and Narathiwat town.

Geography of Narathiwat province